In biology, a pedate structure is a structure that resembles feet, or has a quality of feet. It derives from the Latin verb "pedo", meaning "to furnish with feet".

Plants

Botanically, the term is used to describe compound leaves, veins, or other structures, where the divisions of that structure arise from a central point (as in a palmate structure), but the lateral divisions are further cleft in two. More broadly, it can be used to describe a compound leaf with a terminal leaflet and branching axes to either side which curve outward and backward, to which leaflets are attached on the outer side of the curve.

Animals
In animals, the term "pedate" is used to mean "having feet," a sense that includes the tube feet of echinoderms as well as the vertebrate foot.

References

Plant morphology